Socialist Struggle Movement is a Trotskyist organization in Israel and Palestine. It is affiliated to the International Socialist Alternative. 

It actively campaigns against capitalism and neoliberalism, against workers' exploitation, against the Israeli occupation and the national oppression and expropriation of the Palestinians and against imperialist wars.

External links

Socialist Struggle Movement website
International Socialist Alternative website

Anti-imperialism in Asia
Communism in Israel
Communism in the Palestinian territories
Political organizations based in Israel
Israel and Palestine
Trotskyist organizations in Asia